The 34th European Film Awards were presented in Berlin, Germany on 11 December 2021. Due to the ongoing COVID-19 pandemic, the awards went ahead without an in person audience, taking the form of a hybrid event, including pre-produced and live online.

Selection

Feature Film
The first part of the selection of feature films announced on August 24, 2021.

 200 Meters – Ameen Nayfeh
 A Chiara – Jonas Carpignano
 Ahed's Knee (Ha'berech) – Nadav Lapid
 Ammonite – Francis Lee
 And Tomorrow the Entire World (Und morgen die ganze Welt) – Julia von Heinz
 Annette – Leos Carax
 Apples (Μήλα / Mila) – Christos Nikou
 Assandira – Salvatore Mereu
 Bad Luck Banging or Loony Porn (Babardeală cu bucluc sau porno balamuc) – Radu Jude
 Beginning – Dea Kulumbegashvili
 Brother's Keeper (Okul Tıraşı) – Ferit Karahan
 Compartment No. 6 (Hytti nro 6) – Juho Kuosmanen
 Conference (Конференция / Konferentsiya) – Ivan Tverdovskiy
 Dear Comrades! (Dorogie tovarishchi!) – Andrei Konchalovsky
 Fabian – Going to the Dogs (Fabian oder Der Gang vor die Hunde) – Dominik Graf
 Forest – I See You Everywhere (Rengeteg – mindenhol látlak) – Bence Fliegauf
 Gaza mon amour – Tarzan Nasser, Arab Nasser
 Good Mother (Bonne mère) – Hafsia Herzi
 Great Freedom (Große Freiheit) – Sebastian Meise
 Happening (L'événement) – Audrey Diwan
 Hammamet – Gianni Amelio
 Here We Are (Hine Anachnu) – Nir Bergman
 Hive (Zgjoi) – Blerta Basholli
 I'm Your Man (Ich bin dein Mensch) – Maria Schrader
 Luzzu – Alex Camilleri
 Natural Light (Természetes fény) – Dénes Nagy
 Never Gonna Snow Again (Śniegu już nigdy nie będzie) – Małgorzata Szumowska, Michał Englert

 Night of the Kings (La Nuit des Rois) – Philippe Lacôte
 Nowhere Special – Uberto Pasolini
 Oasis (Oaza) – Ivan Ikic
 Petite Maman – Céline Sciamma
 Petrov's Flu (Petrovy v grippe) – Kirill Serebrennikov
 Pleasure – Ninja Thyberg
 Preparations to Be Together for an Unknown Period of Time (Felkészülés meghatározatlan ideig tartó együttlétre) – Lili Horvát
 Promising Young Woman – Emerald Fennell
 Quo Vadis, Aida? – Jasmila Žbanić
 Riders of Justice (Retfærdighedens Ryttere) – Anders Thomas Jensen
 Supernova – Harry Macqueen
 The Belly of the Sea (El Ventre del Mar) – Agustí Villaronga
 The Dig – Simon Stone
 The Fam (Le Mif) – Fred Baillif
 The Father – Florian Zeller
 The Girl and the Spider (Das Mädchen und die Spinne) – Ramon Zürcher, Silvan Zürcher
 The Hand of God (È stata la mano di Dio) – Paolo Sorrentino
 The Innocents (De uskyldige) – Eskil Vogt
 The Macaluso Sisters (Le sorelle Macaluso) – Emma Dante
 The Mauritanian – Kevin Macdonald
 The Whaler Boy (Kitoboy) – Philipp Yuryev
 The Worst Person in the World (Verdens verste menneske) – Joachim Trier
 Titane – Julia Ducournau
 Tove – Zaida Bergroth
 Unclenching the Fists (Razzhimaya kulaki) – Kira Kovalenko
 What Do We See When We Look at the Sky? (რას ვხედავთ როდესაც ცას ვუყურებთ? / Ras vkhedavt, rodesac cas vukurebt?) – Alexandre Koberidze

Documentary
The selection of 15 documentary films was announced on August 24, 2021.

 A New Shift (Nová šichta) – Jindřich Andrš
 A Song Called Hate – Anna Hildur Hildibrandsdóttir
 All-In – Volkan Üce
 Babi Yar. Context – Sergei Loznitsa
 Flee (Flugt) – Jonas Poher Rasmussen
 Gorbachev. Heaven (Gorbačovs. Paradīze) – Vitaly Manskiy
 Les Enfants Terribles – Ahmet Necdet Cupur
 Mr Bachmann and His Class (Herr Bachmann und seine Klasse) – Maria Speth

 Taming the Garden – Salomé Jashi
 The Banality of Grief – Jon Bang Carlsen
 The First 54 Years: An Abbreviated Manual for Military Occupation – Avi Mograbi
 The Most Beautiful Boy in the World – Kristina Lindström, Kristian Petri
 The Other Side of the River – Antonia Kilian
 The Rain Will Never Stop – Alina Gorlova
 We (Nous) – Alice Diop

Short Film 
The European Short Film 2021 is presented in co-operation with the following European film festivals (due to the COVID-19 pandemic the list of festivals as well as the dates of the festivals are subject to change – festivals might also be held online). The participating festival choose one candidate each and later nominate five short films for the main prize.

 10–16 October 2020: International Short Film Festival of Cyprus - The News (dir. Lorin Terezi)
 15–25 October 2020: Riga International Film Festival - Push This Button If You Begin to Panic (dir. Gabriel Böhmer)
 19–25 October 2020: Uppsala Short Film Festival - Maalbeek (dir. Ismaël Joffroy Chandoutis)
 24–31 October 2020: Valladolid International Film Festival - The Martyr (dir. Fernando Pomares)
 3–8 November 2020: Internationale Kurzfilmtage Winterthur - Dustin (dir. Naïla Guiguet)
 4–15 November 2020: Cork International Film Festival - Blue Fear (dir. Marie Jacotey & Lola Halifa-Legrand)
 17–25 November 2020: Black Nights Film Festival – PÖFF Shorts - Precious (dir. Paul Mas)
 5–12 December 2020: Leuven International Short Film Festival - Marlon Brando (dir. Vincent Tilanus)
 29 January - 6 February 2021: Clermont-Ferrand International Short Film Festival - Beyond is the Day (dir. Damian Kocur) (
 1–7 February 2021: International Film Festival Rotterdam - Flowers Blooming in Our Throats (dir. Eva Giolo)
 1–5 March 2021: Berlin International Film Festival - Easter Eggs (dir. Nicolas Keppens)
 10–14 March 2021: Tampere Film Festival - Mission: Hebron (dir. Rona Segal)
 14–18 April 2021: Go Short – International Short Film Festival Nijmegen - The Natural Death of a Mouse (dir. Katharina Huber)
 27 May - 6 June 2021: VIENNA SHORTS – International Short Film Festival - Bella (dir. Thelyia Petraki) 
 30 May - 6 June 2021: Krakow Film Festival - Hide (dir. Daniel Gray)
 1–7 June 2021: Kurzfilm Festival Hamburg - Minnen (dir. Kristin Johannessen)
 6–17 July 2021: Festival de Cannes - Displaced (dir. Samir Karahoda)
 16–25 July 2021: Curtas Vila do Conde – International Film Festival - Vo (dir. Nicolas Gourault)
 27–31 July 2021: Motovun Film Festival - Armadila (dir. Gorana Jovanović) 
 4–14 August 2021: Locarno Film Festival - In Flow of Words (dir. Eliane Esther Bots) 
 13–20 August 2021: Sarajevo Film Festival - My Uncle Tudor (dir. Olga Lucovnicova) 
 30 August - 5 September 2021: OFF – Odense International - The Long Goodbye (dir. Aneil Karia) 
 1–11 September 2021: Venice Film Festival - Fall of the Ibis King (dir. Mikai Geronimo & Josh O'Caoimh) 
 18–25 September 2021: Encounters Film Festival  - Zonder Meer (dir. Meltse Van Coillie) 
19 - 25 September 2021: Drama International Short Film Festival - Nha Sunhu (dir. José Magro)

Feature Films Awards 
Nominations were announced on November 9, 2021.

Best Film

Best Director

Best Screenwriter

Best Actor

Best Actress

EFA Excellence Awards 
The winners were announced on November 16, 2021. The members of the jury were Camilla Hjelm, Matt Kasmir, Jelena Maksimovic, Ursula Patzak, Célia Sayaphoum, Francis "Kiko" Soeder, Başar Ünder and Leendert van Nimwegen.

Best Composer

Best Production Designer

Best Makeup and Hairstyling

Best Sound Designer

Best Cinematographer

Best Costume Designer

Best Editor

Best Visual Effects

Film Awards Not Based on a Feature Film Selection 
Source:

European Comedy 
The award is presented to the director of a feature-length European comedy intended for theatrical release.

European Discovery - Prix FIPRESCI 
In co-operation with FIPRESCI, the International Federation of Film Critics, the award is presented to a director for his/her first full-length European feature film intended for theatrical release. The nominees were announced on 12 October 2021. The 2021 nominations were determined by a committee consisting of European Film Academy Board Members Anita Juka (Croatia) and Joanna Szymańska (Poland), producer/screenwriter Paula Alvarez Vaccaro (UK, Italy), producer Vladimer Katcharava (Georgia) as well as film critics Marta Balaga (Finland, Poland), Janet Baris (Turkey), Andrei Plakhov (Russia), Frédéric Ponsard (France) and Britt Sørensen (Norway) as representatives of FIPRESCI, the International Federation of Film Critics.

European Documentary 
The award is presented to the director of a European documentary film intended for theatrical release.

European Animated Feature Film 
In co-operation with CARTOON, the European Association of Animation Film, the award is presented to the director of a European animated feature film intended for theatrical release.

European Short Film 
The award is presented to the director of a European short film. The final five short films were nominated from the final list by the participating festivals.

Honorary Awards

Audience Awards

Lux European Audience Film Award
Presented in co-operation with the European Parliament and in partnership with the European Commission and Europa Cinemas, the award is built on the LUX Prize, the film prize of the European Parliament established in 2007 as a symbol of the European Parliament's commitment to culture, and EFA's People's Choice Award. It continues building bridges across Europe, as one of the LUX Award's objectives, by shedding light on films that go to the heart of the European public debate. The award aims at strengthening ties between politics and citizens, by inviting European audiences to become active protagonists by voting for their favourite films.

The three nominated films are viewed by audiences in cinemas (online if the situation requires it) across Europe, via the LUX Film Days (February – May) and the LUX Audience Week (March or May depending on the ceremony date). Voting opens for the public from day 1 after the EFA Ceremony until two weeks before the LUX Ceremony. Members of the European Parliament vote from the beginning of March until the day before the Awards Ceremony (exact timeline TBD/TBC). The final ranking will be determined by combining the public vote ratings and the vote ratings by the Members of the European Parliament, with each group weighing 50 per cent. The film with the highest average rating will become the winner.

EFA Young Audience Award (YAA)
The award is presented to the director of a European film that addresses an audience between 12 and 14 years of age.

European University Film Award (EUFA) 
Presented in co-operation with Filmfest Hamburg, the award actively involves university students, spreads the “European idea” and transports the spirit of European cinema to an audience group of 20-29-year-olds. It also supports film dissemination, film education and the culture of debating. Based on the Feature Film Selection 2021 and the Documentary Selection 2021 Filmfest Hamburg and EFA nominate five films. They are later viewed in non-commercial closed jury sessions and discussed at the participating universities. The students at each institution select their favourite film. The nominations were announced on 28 September 2021.

References

External links 
 

2021 film awards
2021 in Europe
2021 in Germany
European Film Awards ceremonies